Andevoranto  is a rural municipality in the Brickaville District, Atsinanana Region, Madagascar.

It is located near the coast and near the mouth of the Rianila River at a distance of 20 km from Brickaville.

During the French colonial rule of the island, Andrevoranto was the capital of Andevoranto Province, and sources also described it as a former capital of the Betsimisaraka people in the region.  The town was at that point also the junction of a number of important roads, including the key road from the coast to the capital, Antananarivo.  Today, the key route of Route nationale 2 from the capital is located west of Andevoranto.

Geography
It is situated 20 km South of Brickaville and 100 km from Toamasina.

Fokontany
12 Fokontany (villages) are part of this municipality: Andovoranto, Ambatobe, Ianakonitra, Andavakimena, Sondrara, Manakambahiny, Ambodivoara, Vohitrampasina, Vavony, Ambila Lemaitso, Manaratsandry and Manerinerina.

Personalities
Henri de Solages

References

Populated places in Atsinanana